Panna Maria may refer to:

 Mary (mother of Jesus) (Polish, Czech, and Slovak; literally: Virgin Mary)
 Panna Maria, Texas